Morton Minsky (January 10, 1902 – March 23, 1987) was the last of four brothers who had created Minsky's Burlesque in Manhattan.

Biography
He was the youngest of the four Minsky brothers. Morton joined the family business in 1924, after graduating from New York University. He later became involved in real estate in Manhattan. In 1967, he was senior vice president of Daniel A. Brener, Inc., where he headed their motion-picture theater sales and leasing division. He co-wrote Minsky's Burlesque in 1986. He died on March 24, 1987, of cancer at his home in Manhattan.

Publications

References

1902 births
1987 deaths
New York University alumni
Deaths from cancer in New York (state)